Kansas City metropolitan area is a metropolitan area in Missouri and Kansas, anchored by Kansas City, Missouri.

Kansas City may also refer to:

 Kansas City, Missouri, the largest city in the metropolitan area

Places
 Kansas City, Kansas
 North Kansas City, Missouri
 Kansas City, Oregon

Music
 "Kansas City" (Leiber and Stoller song)
 covered by Wilbert Harrison in 1959
 "Kansas City" (Sneaky Sound System song), 2008
 "Kansas City" (Oklahoma!), a song from the 1943 musical Oklahoma!
 "Kansas City", a 1974 song by the Les Humphries Singers
 "Kansas City", a song by Melissa Etheridge from the 2012 album 4th Street Feeling 
 "Kansas City", a song by The New Basement Tapes from the 2014 album Lost on the River: The New Basement Tapes 
 "Kansas City", a 2000 song by Okkervil River
 "The Kansas City Song", a 1970 song by Buck Owens and the Buckaroos
 Kansas City jazz, a style of jazz that originated in the 1920s and 1930s
 Kansas City blues (music), a style of blues that developed in the 1940s

Sports and games
 Kansas City Current, an American professional women's soccer team based in Kansas City, Kansas
 Kansas City Roos, the athletic program of the University of Missouri–Kansas City
 Kansas City (ABA), a former American Basketball Association team in Kansas City, Missouri
 FC Kansas City, a 2012–2017 NWSL team
 Kansas City lowball, a nickname for Deuce-to-seven lowball poker

Transport
 City of Kansas City, a 1947 to 1968 Wabash Railroad streamliner train
 City of St. Louis (train), a Union Pacific streamliner train called City of Kansas City from 1968 to 1971, 
 USS Kansas City, the name of several U.S. Navy ships

Other
 Kansas City (film), a 1996 film by Robert Altman
 Diocese of Kansas City, the 1850–1947 name of what is now the Roman Catholic Diocese of Kansas City–Saint Joseph
 Kansas City standard, a digital data format for storing computer programs and data on music/audio cassette tapes

See also
 North Kansas City, Missouri, a northern suburb of Kansas City, Missouri
 Max's Kansas City, a nightclub and restaurant in New York City, from 1965 to 1981
 List of cities in Kansas
 Kansas City Blues (disambiguation)
 Kansas (disambiguation)
 KC (disambiguation)
 KSC (disambiguation)